The first season of Schitt's Creek a Canadian television sitcom created by Daniel Levy and father Eugene Levy premiered on January 13, 2015, and concluded on March 31, 2015, on CBC Television. The season aired 13 episodes and saw the introduction of the characters Johnny Rose, Moira Rose, David Rose, and Alexis Rose. The season was produced by Not a Real Company Productions.

The season featured a large cast of actors credited in starring roles, including series creators Eugene & Daniel Levy, close friends and even family to the Levys starred as well, including Catherine O'Hara, Annie Murphy, Sarah Levy, and Chris Elliott.

On January 12, 2015, CBC Television renewed the series for a second season.

Episodes

Cast and characters

Main 
 Eugene Levy as Johnny Rose
 Catherine O'Hara as Moira Rose
 Daniel Levy as David Rose
 Annie Murphy as Alexis Rose
 Jennifer Robertson as Jocelyn Schitt
 Emily Hampshire as Stevie Budd
 Tim Rozon as Mutt Schitt
 Chris Elliott as Roland Schitt

Starring 
 Dustin Milligan as Ted Mullens
 Sarah Levy as Twyla Sands
 John Hemphill as Bob Currie
 Karen Robinson as Ronnie Lee

Recurring 
 Marilyn Bellfontaine as Gwen Currie
 Rizwan Manji as Ray Butani

Special Guest Stars 
 Elizabeth McEachern as Robin
 Richard Waugh as Herb Ertlinger
 Jennifer Irwin as Dee Dee

Reception and release

Critical response 
The first season of Schitt's Creek generally received positive reviews. It holds an approval rating of 67% on Rotten Tomatoes based on 27 ratings averaging 6.4/10. The website's critical consensus reads, "The title is one of the best jokes of Schitt's Creek, but performances from Eugene Levy and Catherine O'Hara give the writing a comedic boost." On Metacritic, the first season has a score of 64 out of 100, based on 11 critics, indicating "generally favorable reviews". Vinay Menon of the Toronto Star wrote that the show "is one of the best CBC comedies in years". After being picked up by Pop, the Los Angeles Times described the show as "very funny, beautifully played, [and] sometimes touching," although Mike Hale of The New York Times called Schitt's Creek "drab and underwritten".

Awards and nominations 

Schitt's Creeks first season received two Directors Guild of Canada awards from three nominations, the directing team of "Our Cup Runneth Over" & Brendan Smith each won the award respectively. While the directing team for "Surprise Party" we're also nominated but did not win the award. At the 2016 ceremony, the first season also received nine Canadian Screen Awards from 16 nominations. The winners included Eugene Levy, Dan Levy, Andrew Barnsley, Fred Levy, Ben Feigin, Mike Short, Kevin White, Colin Brunton, Catherine O'Hara & Chris Elliott.

Release 
The show initially premiered on the CBC in Canada on Tuesday, January 13, 2015, at 9:00 pm/9:30 pm NT with back-to-back episodes. It made its debut in the United States on Pop TV on Wednesday, February 11, 2015, at 10:00 pm ET/PT.

Notes

References 

Schitt's Creek
2015 Canadian television seasons